The Baixada Santista is a metropolitan area located on the coast of São Paulo state in Brazil, with a population of 1.7 million. Its most populous city is Santos.

As an administrative division (Região Metropolitana da Baixada Santista), it was created in 1996. It consists of 9 municipalities.

The Baixada Santista is a major tourism region, especially for its numerous beaches. It also features the Port of Santos, the busiest container port in Latin America, and Cubatão, an industrial hub.

List of municipalities

References

External links
 Agência Metropolitana da Baixada Santista